Vikings is a historical drama television series written and created by Michael Hirst for the television channel History. Filmed in Ireland, it premiered on 3 March 2013 in Canada, concluding on December 30, 2020. A standalone sequel streaming television series, Vikings: Valhalla, written and created by Jeb Stuart for Netflix, premiered on February 25, 2022.

Vikings is inspired by the sagas of Viking Ragnar Lothbrok, one of the best-known legendary Norse heroes and notorious as the scourge of England and France, while Vikings: Valhalla, set 100 years later, chronicles the beginning of the end of the Viking Age, marked by the Battle of Stamford Bridge in 1066, and the adventures of Leif Erikson, his sister Freydís, Harald Hardrada and the Norman King William The Conqueror. The broad historical narrative of both series are based on real events, with some of the principal characters representing real figures from history and/or legend.

Vikings portrays Ragnar as a former farmer who rises to fame by successful raids into England, and eventually becomes king, with the support of his family and fellow warriors: his brother Rollo, his son Björn Ironside, and his wives—the shieldmaiden Lagertha and the princess Aslaug. Vikings: Valhalla portrays Leif and Freydís as immigrants from Iceland to Norway, who are respectively pulled into the Viking campaign to conquer Great Britain and the growing religious divide between Christians and Pagans. As of 2022, The Seer (portrayed by John Kavanagh) is the only character to appear in both series.

Main characters
The following is a list of series regulars who have appeared in one or more of the six seasons of Vikings and Vikings: Valhalla. The characters are listed in the order they were first credited.

Cast table
  = Main cast (credited) 
  = Recurring cast (3+)
  = Guest cast (1-2)

Cast notes

Vikings

Ragnar Lothbrok

 Played by Travis Fimmel (seasons 1–4)
Originally a farmer, Viking Ragnar Lothbrok claims to be descended from the god Odin.  He becomes Earl of Kattegat after he challenges and kills the ruthless Earl Haraldson.  He is also a feared warrior, becomes a raider of undiscovered lands, and, eventually, King of Denmark. Despite his reputation for ruthlessness and brutality, he is a curious man eager to learn about other cultures.  Based on the semi-legendary Ragnar Lodbrok.

Lagertha
 Played by Katheryn Winnick (seasons 1–6) and Mabel Hurley (season 5)
Lagertha is Ragnar's first wife and a shieldmaiden. Following her separation from Ragnar, Lagertha rises to become Earl of Hedeby in her own right, going by the name Earl Ingstad. Following the deaths of Ragnar and Aslaug, she becomes Queen of Kattegat.  Based on the legendary Lagertha.

Rollo
 Played by Clive Standen (seasons 1–5)
Ragnar's brother. A ruthless and skilled warrior, but his life in his brother's shadow makes Rollo's feelings towards Ragnar change from love and admiration to hateful jealousy. Eventually, he defects to the Franks and is made Duke of Normandy.  Based on the historical Rollo.

Siggy
 Played by Jessalyn Gilsig (seasons 1–3)
Earl Haraldson's wife, and later the lover of Rollo. She possesses a strategic mind and an urge to regain her power and influence, but grows to care for Ragnar and his family. She drowns while attempting to save Ragnar's children from a similar fate as her own.

Floki
 Played by Gustaf Skarsgård (seasons 1–6)
A gifted but eccentric shipbuilder and friend of Ragnar.  His ships create a revolution in shipwright techniques.  He considers himself descended from the trickster god Loki. Loosely based on the historical Hrafna-Flóki Vilgerðarson.

Earl Haraldson
 Played by Gabriel Byrne (season 1)
Ragnar's predecessor as Earl of Kattegat and husband of Siggy. He grows to resent Ragnar's ambitions to raid the West, and sees Ragnar's growing popularity as a threat. He is killed by Ragnar during personal combat.

Athelstan
 Played by George Blagden (seasons 1–4)
An Anglo-Saxon monk from the monastery of Lindisfarne in Northumbria. Captured by Ragnar on his first raid, Athelstan is constantly torn between the customs of Christian England and the pagan ways of Scandinavia. Athelstan becomes a confidant of King Ecbert after he is captured by his army.

King Horik of Denmark
 Played by Donal Logue (seasons 1–2)
A powerful king in Denmark who ends up being overthrown by Ragnar. Based on the historical Horik I.

Aslaug
 Played by Alyssa Sutherland (seasons 1–4)
Ragnar's second wife, claiming to be the daughter of the shieldmaiden and valkyrie Brynhildr and the dragonslayer Sigurd. When Ragnar becomes King of Kattegat, she becomes its queen. She is killed and usurped by a vengeful Lagertha. Based on the legendary Aslaug.

King Ecbert of Wessex
 Played by Linus Roache (seasons 2–4)
Ruler of the most powerful kingdom in England. He dreams of becoming Bretwalda and becomes an unlikely friend of Ragnar. Based on the historical Egbert of Wessex.

Björn Ironside
 Played by Nathan O'Toole (seasons 1–2, 4) and Alexander Ludwig (seasons 2–6)
Ragnar and Lagertha's son, given his epithet by his father after his first battle with the Saxons. Based on the historical Björn Ironside.

Kalf
 Played by Ben Robson (seasons 3–4)
A prominent and ambitious Hedeby villager who later betrays Lagertha and takes her earldom.

Harbard
 Played by Kevin Durand (seasons 3–4)
A charismatic wanderer and storyteller who visits Kattegat.

Emperor Charles of West Francia
 Played by Lothaire Bluteau (seasons 3–4)
Ruler in Paris, he witnesses Ragnar's attack on the city and later employs Rollo as a defender against Viking raids. Charles is a composite character drawing from the historical Charles the Bald (grandson of Charlemagne who first defended Paris from the Vikings), Charles the Fat (who commanded Odo) and Charles the Simple (who encountered Rollo, and may have had a daughter Gisela).

The Seer
 Played by John Kavanagh (seasons 1–6; Valhalla)
Seiðr of Kattegat. A 200-year-old blind being who often provides mysterious predictions to the characters. He is murdered by Ivar after refusing to recognise Ivar as a god and predicting Ivar's fall. In Valhalla, the Seer returns as a spirit guide, who appears to Freydís Eiríksdóttir and Jarl Gorm throughout their lives.

King Harald Finehair
 Played by Peter Franzén (seasons 4–6)
The ambitious king of Vestfold, who seeks to become king of all Norway and marry  Ellisif. He allies with Ragnar during his second raid on Paris. He then conquers his neighbours' lands. He joins the Great Heathen Army and battles Aella and Aethelwulf. He fails to conquer Kattegat. He discovers Ellisif is married, and murders her husband, and then kidnaps and marries Astrid. She is killed in battle and he vows vengeance on Lagertha. He sails with Bjorn to retake Kattegat, but their fleet is damaged by a storm. Harald saves Bjorn's life but takes a serious battle wound. Olaf rescues Harald, but occupies Vestfold. Harald's men beg Bjorn for help, and Bjorn repays his debt. When Olaf tries to have Bjorn elected as over-king of Norway, Harald defeats Bjorn in the election, but Harald's men fail to kill Bjorn. Olaf refuses to recognise Harald, so Harald has him put away and sends warriors to secure his borders.

Based on the historical Harald Fairhair.

Halfdan the Black
 Played by Jasper Pääkkönen (seasons 4–6)
Harald's violent younger brother. He hates Christians and tries to kill as many as possible. He grows tired of living in his brother's shadow and of Harald's war with other Norsemen, and joins Bjorn's expedition to the Mediterranean. They form a close friendship which leads Halfdan to join Lagertha's side when Ivar and Harald declare war. Faced by Harald in battle, he is killed. A composite character of the historical Hastein and historical Halfdan the Black, the father of Harald Fairhair.

Ivar the Boneless
 Played by an uncredited infant actor (seasons 2–3), James Quinn Markey (season 4) and Alex Høgh Andersen (seasons 4–6)
Ragnar and Aslaug's fourth and most violent son. A birth defect has rendered his legs useless and left him impotent. Ivar is more unstable than his brothers, sadistic and seemingly narcissistic. While publicly boastful, he is insecure and feels unloved except by his mother Aslaug. When Lagertha kills Aslaug, Ivar vows vengeance and with the help of Harald and Rollo makes himself king of Kattegat. He is married to his former slave Freydis, who manipulates him. Based on the historical Ivar the Boneless.

Hvitserk
 Played by Cathal O'Hallin (seasons 2–3), Stephen Rockett (season 4) and Marco Ilsø (seasons 4–6)
Ragnar and Aslaug's second son. He enjoys battle and adventure and sides with his younger brother Ivar when Ivar and Ubbe fall out. As Ivar's megalomania increases and Ivar becomes more abusive of him, Hvitserk starts to question his decision. A composite of the semi-historical or legendary Hvitserk, the historical Halfdan Ragnarsson and the historical warlord Guthrum.

Sigurd Snake-in-the-Eye
 Played by an uncredited infant actor (seasons 2–3), Elijah O'Sullivan (season 4) and David Lindström (season 4)
Ragnar and Aslaug's third son. Killed by his brother Ivar after years of bullying. Based on the historical Sigurd Snake-in-the-Eye.

Ubbe
 Played by Cormac Melia (seasons 2–3), Luke Shanahan (season 4) and Jordan Patrick Smith (seasons 4–6)
Ragnar and Aslaug's first son. He is the most responsible of Aslaug's sons, and does not initially take part in raiding, preferring to stay and protect Kattegat. When his mother is killed, he wants revenge. However, as his previously warm relationship with Ivar turns hostile, he sides with Lagertha. When Lagertha is driven into exile in England, Ubbe becomes Alfred's advisor and converts to Christianity. Based on the historical Ubba.

Aethelwulf
 Played by Moe Dunford (seasons 2–5)
Son of King Ecbert. He is married to Princess Judith, with whom he has a son, Prince Aethelred.  He dies by asphyxiation after being stung by a bee. Based on the historical Aethelwulf.

Bishop Heahmund
 Played by Jonathan Rhys Meyers (seasons 4–5)
A very religious warrior priest. Heahmund leads an army in resistance against the Norse presence in York, becoming a principal ally to Aethelwulf. He is eventually captured by Ivar who admires his skill as a warrior. Heahmund fights for Ivar against Lagertha, but is captured in the initial battle. Having become smitten by Lagertha, he seduces her and switches to her side. On his suggestion, Lagertha and her followers seek refuge in England. Through Heahmund's influence the Northmen are given sanctuary in return for fighting against other Viking raiders. When Harald Finehair attempts to raid Wessex, Heahmund fights in the frontline. In the battle he is wounded by arrows and killed by Gunnhild. Broadly inspired by the historical Heahmund.

Oleg the Prophet
 Played by Danila Kozlovsky (season 6)
The Varangian (east European Viking) ruler of Kiev, called "the Prophet". He is the protector of the heir to the Rus kingdom, Igor and brother in law of Igor's father Rurik. Oleg is sadistic and uses his status as Igor's protector as a pretext for consolidating control over the kingdom. He has successfully sacked Constantinople, but is critical of Rurik's eastward expansion. Oleg wants to conquer Scandinavia which he claims is the property of the Rus. Oleg takes in Ivar, thinking him useful for his plan to invade Scandinavia. Oleg forms an uneasy friendship with Ivar after revealing that he murdered his wife after discovering her infidelity. Ivar's similar experience with Freydis brings them closer. The character is based on the semi-historical Oleg the Prophet.

Erik
 Played by Eric Johnson (season 6)
An outlaw who helps Bjorn and later Harald. He later becomes the King of Kattegat in Harald's absence alongside Queen Ingrid but she has him killed.

Torvi
 Played by Georgia Hirst (seasons 2–6)
Wife of Jarl Borg, then the wife of Erlendur, later the wife of Bjorn and eventually, the wife of Ubbe. Initially a timid girl, she rises to become a shieldmaiden under Lagertha.

Gunnhild
 Played by Ragga Ragnars (seasons 5–6)
Jarl Olavsonn's wife. Harald becomes enamored with her, but after Olavsonn's death, she marries Bjorn instead. As his wife, she becomes queen of Kattegat. She is based on the quasi-historical Gunnhild.

Othere
 Played by Ray Stevenson (season 6)
A wanderer living in Iceland. His real name is Athelstan and he was a monk in England. During his travels as a missionary, he took the identity of the dying wanderer Othere and moved to Iceland. He then sailed west and glimpsed the Golden Land. Ubbe asks him to sail again with him to find the new land.

Vikings: Valhalla

Leif Erikson
 Played by Sam Corlett

Originally an explorer from Greenland, Leif was the son of Erik the Red, the founder of the first Norse settlement in Greenland, and Thjodhild of Iceland. Based on the legendary Leif Erikson.

Harald Sigurdsson
 Played by Leo Suter

Great-grandson of Harald Fairhair and the younger brother of Olaf Haraldson, Harald was ambitious, who seeks to become king of all Norway someday. He allies with Canute during his raid on England. Based on the historical Harald Hardrada.

Freydís Eiríksdóttir
 Played by Frida Gustavsson

Freydís is the daughter of Erik the Red, and the sister of Leif Erikson. She is portrayed as a masculine, strong-willed woman who would defy the odds of her society.

King Canute
 Played by Bradley Freegard

King Canute is the a powerful King of Denmark and Norway. Based on the historical Cnut.

Olaf Haraldsson
 Played by Jóhannes Haukur Jóhannesson

Older brother of Harald, son of Harald Grenske and great grandson of Harald Fairhair. Olaf dreams of becoming King of Norway, usurp danish rule and root out paganism. Based on the historical Olaf II of Norway.

Jarl Haakon
 Played by Caroline Henderson (season 1)

Haakon was the Jarl of Kattegat, as a vassal under the King Canute. Her husband was killed by Christians. Her grandmother was an African noblewoman Haakon's grandfather had met in Alexandria. She was killed during the attack by Jarl Kåre. Based on the historical Haakon Ericsson.

Emma of Normandy
 Played by Laura Berlin

A descendant of Rollo, who became the English queen through her marriages to the Anglo-Saxon king Æthelred the Unready and later King Canute. Based on the historical Emma of Normandy.

Earl Godwin
 Played by David Oakes

Godwin, the son of a disgraced ealdorman, became one of King Æthelred the Unready of England's most trusted advisors by delivering him something none of his peers could: the truth. Following Aethelred's death, he serves as an advisor to young King Edmund until the Vikings overrun London following which he becomes an advisor to King Canute. Based on historical Godwin, Earl of Wessex.

Recurring characters
The following is a list of recurring characters, listed in the order that they first appeared on the show.

Cast table
  = Main cast (credited) 
  = Recurring cast (3+)
  = Guest cast (1-2)

Cast notes

Vikings

Svein
 Played by David Pearse (season 1)
A loyal henchman of Earl Haraldson. He is killed by Rollo, after Earl Haraldson's death.

Gyda
 Played by Ruby O'Leary (seasons 1 and 4)
Daughter of Ragnar and Lagertha. She dies in a plague. Loosely based on Ragnar's unnamed daughters.

Erik
 Played by Vladimir Kulich (season 1)
Elderly Viking and one of Ragnar's warriors. He has a wife, Elisef, and a son, Leif. He is an early supporter of Ragnar and is murdered by earl Haraldson.

Leif
 Played by Diarmaid Murtagh (season 1)
One of Ragnar's warriors and son of Erik and Elisef. He offers himself as a sacrifice at Uppsala.

Arne
 Played by Tadhg Murphy (seasons 1–2)
One of Ragnar's warriors; an archer with an eye patch. He is killed in battle by Rollo.

Torstein
 Played by Jefferson Hall (seasons 1–3)
One of Ragnar's warriors and closest friends. He makes a suicidal attack on the Mercians after having contracted gangrene and amputation of his arm prevents fail to stop the spread.

Elisef
 Played by Carrie Crowley (seasons 1–2)
Wife of Erik and the mother of Leif.

King Aelle of Northumbria

 Played by Ivan Kaye (seasons 1–4)
Ruler of one of England's ancient kingdoms and the first to be attacked by Ragnar. Father of Princess Judith, Aethelwulf's wife, and grandfather of Princes Aethelred and Alfred. Based on the historical King Ælla of Northumbria. He killed Ragnar by throwing him into a pit of snakes and was executed by Bjorn as retribution for Ragnar's death.

Thyri
 Played by Elinor Crawley (seasons 1 and 3)
Daughter of Earl Haraldson and Siggy. She, along with Gyda, dies in a plague.

Helga
 Played by Maude Hirst (seasons 1–4)
Floki's long-suffering lover and wife. Murdered by her own adopted daughter who shortly after committed suicide.

Rafarta
 Played by Donna Dent (seasons 1, 5)
A woman of Kattegat and Eyvind's wife. She joins Floki's expedition to set up a colony. Her brother was killed by Kjetill's father Erik Tryggvason prior to the events of the series. She is killed by Kjetill.

Queen Ealhswith of Northumbria
 Played by Cathy Whyte (seasons 1–2, 4)
Wife of King Aelle and the mother of Princess Judith.

Jarl Borg
 Played by Thorbjørn Harr (seasons 1–2)
A powerful warlord of an earldom in Götaland. He has a wife, Torvi, and a son, Guthrum. He was killed by Ragnar with the Blood Eagle, for having attacked his people and his family.

Prince Erlendur
 Played by Edvin Endre (seasons 2–4)
King Horik's first son. He is cruel and spiteful. After the death of his father, he seeks vengeance against Ragnar and his family. He ends up marrying Torvi and conspires with Kalf to ruin Ragnar. He is killed by Torvi herself after frequently threatening Torvi's son Guthrum.

Earl Sigvard
 Played by Morten Suurballe (season 2)
Lagertha's second husband and Earl of Hedeby. He is killed by Lagertha after multiple incidents of abuse.

Bishop Edmund
 Played by Philip O'Sullivan (seasons 2–4)
An influential advisor at the court of King Ecbert. He is murdered by Hvitserk when the Great Heathen Army sacks Ecbert's villa. Based on the historical Eadmund of Winchester.

Porunn
 Played by Gaia Weiss (seasons 2–3)
Bjorn's love interest and later first wife. Shortly after the birth of their daughter Siggy she leaves Bjorn.

Einar
 Played by Steve Wall (seasons 2–4)
A scheming troublemaker, and ally of Earl Sigvard of Hedeby. He later betrays Sigvard and helps Lagertha gain power in Hedeby. When Lagertha rejects his advances, he helps Kalf gain power in Hedeby. In the end, he is injured by Kalf and killed by Lagertha.

Judith
 Played by Sarah Greene (season 2) and Jennie Jacques (seasons 3–5)
Daughter of King Aelle and Queen Ealhswith of Northumbria and the wife of Aethelwulf. She has a legitimate son with Aethelwulf, Aethelred, and an illegitimate one with Athelstan, Alfred. Based on the historical Judith of Flanders.

Kwenthrith
 Played by Amy Bailey (seasons 2–4)
Contender to the throne of Mercia and later its Queen. She has a brother, Prince Burgred, and a putative illegitimate son with Ragnar, Magnus. She is stabbed by Judith after threatening to kill Ecbert. Based on the historical Cwenthryth.

Angrboda
 Played by an uncredited infant actress (seasons 2–3) and Rosalie Connerty (season 4)
Floki and Helga's daughter. She dies in childhood.

Prince Burgred
 Played by Aaron Monaghan (season 3)
The rebellious brother of Kwenthrith. Based on the historical Burgred of Mercia. He is poisoned by Kwenthrith who becomes Queen of Mercia.

Aethelred
 Played by an uncredited infant actor (seasons 3–4) and Darren Cahill (season 5)
Prince Aethelwulf and Princess Judith's son. Based on the historical Æthelred of Wessex.

Earl Siegfried
 Played by Greg Orvis (season 3)
A friend of Earl Kalf's and an ally to King Ragnar. He is killed at the Siege of Paris. Loosely based on the Norse chief Sigfred who took part in the Siege of Paris (885–86).

Sinric
 Played by Frankie McCafferty (seasons 3–5)
Sinric (Sindric from season 5 onwards) is a wanderer who taught Ragnar about England and Frankia, and who serves as a translator for the Northmen. Loosely based on the Norse chief Sinric who took part in the Siege of Paris (885–86).

Alfred
 Played by an uncredited infant actor (season 3), Conor O'Hanlon (season 4), Isaac O'Sullivan (season 4) and Ferdia Walsh-Peelo (seasons 5–6)
Son of Judith and Athelstan. Broadly based on the historical Alfred the Great.

Count Odo
 Played by Owen Roe (seasons 3–4)
In charge of defending the city from the Vikings. Based on the historical Odo of France. He is flogged to death by Roland on Emperor Charles's orders.

Princess Gisla
 Played by Morgane Polanski (seasons 3–4)
Daughter of Emperor Charles and later wedded to Duke Rollo. Based on the historical Gisela of France.

Roland
 Played by Huw Parmenter (seasons 3–4)
Count Odo's first-in-command. He has an incestuous relationship with his sister, Therese. He is assassinated with his sister by Emperor Charles's men.

Therese
 Played by Karen Hassan (seasons 3–4)
A noblewoman, Roland's sister, and Count Odo's mistress. She is assassinated with her brother by Emperor Charles's men.

Guthrum
 Played by an uncredited infant actor (seasons 3–4), Anton Giltrap (season 4) and Ben Roe (season 5)
Jarl Borg and Torvi's son. He is killed in battle by Hvitserk.

Magnus
 Played by an uncredited infant actor (seasons 3–4), Cameron Hogan (season 4) and Dean Ridge (season 5)
Ragnar and Kwenthrith's supposed illegitimate son. After spending his life as a hostage, he is evicted by Aethelwulf when Ragnar denies being his father. Magnus starts to consider himself a Viking, converts to the Norse religion, and joins Harald. He joins Bjorn and Hvitserk's siege of Kattegat but suffers a crisis of faith. Coming to terms with his new identity, he tries to scale the walls as the battle turns against Bjorn. Magnus is shot to death by White Hair, when he fails to protect himself with his shield.

Yidu
 Played by Dianne Doan (season 4)
Chinese slave brought after the siege of Paris who is bought by Queen Aslaug. She becomes protective of the sons of Ragnar and also forms a close bond with Ragnar, providing him with a drug and becoming his lover. Later she becomes distressed with the Viking way of life and tries to leave Ragnar. When she refuses to provide him with more of the drug and blackmails him, Ragnar drowns her.

Father Prudentius
 Played by Seán Ó Meallaigh (seasons 4)
Serves at the court of King Ecbert.

Waerferth the Scout
 Played by Des Carney (season 4)
One of King Ecbert's scouts. He is stabbed to death by Kwenthrith.

Astrid
 Played by Josefin Asplund (seasons 4–5)
Shieldmaiden and lover of Lagertha. She and Bjorn have a secret affair. She is kidnapped by Harald and marries him but grows to become fond of him. When attempting to warn Lagertha of an attack, she is raped by the whaler she tries to bribe. She falls pregnant and unsure if the baby is Harald's or her rapist's, induces Lagertha to kill her during battle, admitting that she was always her true love. After her death, Harald carries her earring around as remembrance and swears vengeance on Lagertha.

Margrethe
 Played by Ida Marie Nielsen (seasons 4–5)
One of Aslaug's slaves in Kattegat and the shared lover of Ubbe, Hvitserk and Sigurd. She is disturbed by Ivar and fears him. She is freed and marries Ubbe. Hvitserk remains her lover with Ubbe's consent. Ubbe eventually rejects her to marry Torvi, causing Margrethe to go insane. Hvitserk takes care of her, but when Ivar has a dream where Margrethe stabs him, he murders her using assassins.

Hali
 Played by an uncredited infant actor (season 4) and Ryan Henson (seasons 5–6)
Bjorn and Torvi's son. He is killed by White Hair.

Asa
 Played by an uncredited infant actor (season 4), Svea Killoran (season 5) and Elodie Curry (season 6)
Bjorn and Torvi's daughter. Falls overboard of a ship after seeing Jörmungandr and dies.

Tanaruz
 Played by Sinead Gormally (season 4)
A Moorish orphan girl adopted by Helga. When Helga brings her to the sack of Ecbert's villa, Tanaruz snaps and stabs Helga and then kills herself.

Lord Cuthred
 Played by Jonathan Delaney Tynan (season 5)
A nobleman and member of the clergy of Wessex. After Bishop Heahmund is taken by the Vikings, Cuthred is appointed Bishop of Sherbornein place of Heahmund who is presumed dead. Heahmund later kills him for conspiring against him and Alfred.

White Hair
 Played by Kieran O'Reilly (seasons 5–6)
The leader of Ivar's bodyguards. After Ivar's defeat, he is outcast from Kattegat by King Bjorn. He turns to banditry and raids the village where Lagertha has retired, killing Bjorn's son Halli in such a raid. Lagertha leads the resistance and eventually kills White Hair in single combat.

Queen Freydis
 Played by Alicia Agneson (season 5)
Ivar's former slave and love interest. She becomes Queen of Kattegat by marrying Ivar. As Ivar is believed to be impotent, she has sex with a slave whom she later murders in order to produce a child. Freydis claims she conceived through magically consuming Ivar's blood. This and Freydis's sycophancy lead Ivar to declare himself a god. When the child is eventually born, it is deformed. This breaks Ivar's ego and he suspects Freydis has fooled him. Ivar leaves the child out to die, turning Freydis against him. She shows Hvitserk, Bjorn and Harald a secret way through the walls, allowing them to storm Kattegat. As the city falls, she admits what she has done and Ivar strangles her to death.

Kassia
 Played by Karima McAdams (season 5)
A Byzantine abbess.  Loosely inspired by the historical Kassiani.

Kjetill Flatnose
 Played by Adam Copeland (seasons 5–6)
A violent and bold patriarch of a large family, the son of Eric Tryggvasson. He is chosen by Floki for an expedition to set up a colony. Based on the legendary Ketill Flatnose.

Eyvind
 Played by Kris Holden-Ried (season 5)
A Viking of Kattegat who joins Floki's expedition. He becomes disillusioned in Iceland, and becomes antagonistic to Floki. His wife Rafarta's brother was killed by Kjetill's father, which makes him antagonistic to Kjetill. After his son Bul is accidentally killed by Thorgrim, Thorgrim is found drowned; Floki believes Eyvind is responsible. Eyvind's daughter in law Thorunn vanishes. Rafarta claims Thorunn was suicidal, which is disproved when Floki produces her body. Rafarta and Asbjorn are implicated as the murderers and Floki banishes Eyvind and his family. The family is ravaged by disease and weather and sends Helgi for help. Helgi brings back Floki, Kjetill and Frodi, along with several of Kjetill's farmhands. The farmhands capture Floki at knifepoint as Kjetill and Frodi murder Eyvind and all of his family.

Aud
 Played by Leah McNamara (season 5)
Kjetill Flatnose and Ingvild's daughter, who joins Floki's expedition to set up a colony. Something of a surrogate daughter to Floki, she tries to mend peace between the feuding clans of Kjetill and Eyvind. She kills herself in Iceland after finding out Kjetill and her brother Frodi murdered Eyvind and his family.

Helgi the Lean
 Played by Jack McEvoy (season 5)
Eyvind and Rafarta's son, who joins Floki's expedition to set up a colony. He is killed by Kjetill.

Thorunn (Kjetillsdóttir)
 Played by Mei Bignall (season 5)
Kjetill Flatnose and Ingvild's daughter and Helgi's wife, who joins Floki's expedition to set up a colony. She is killed by Asbjorn.

Ingvild
 Played by Kelly Campbell (seasons 5–6)
Kjetill Flatnose's wife, who joins Floki's expedition to set up a colony.

Bul
 Played by James Craze (season 5)
Eyvind and Rafarta's son, who joins Floki's expedition to set up a colony. He is killed by Thorgrim.

Asbjorn
 Played by Elijah Rowen (season 5)
Eyvind and Rafarta's son, who joins Floki's expedition to set up a colony. He is killed by Kjetill.

Thorgrim
 Played by Rob Malone (season 5)
Kjetill Flatnose and Ingvild's son, who joins Floki's expedition to set up a colony. He mysteriously drowns in Iceland.

Frodi
 Played by Scott Graham (seasons 5–6)
Kjetill Flatnose and Ingvild's son, who joins Floki's expedition to set up a colony. He assists Kjetill in massacring Eyvind and his family.

Jorunn
 Played by Tallulah Belle Earley (season 5)
Eyvind and Rafarta's daughter, who joins Floki's expedition to set up a colony. She is killed by Frodi.

Svase
 Played by Anthony Brophy (season 5)
A Sami chief and an ally to Lagertha. He is killed in battle. Loosely based on the legendary Sami king Svasi.

Snaefrid
 Played by Dagny Backer Johnsen (season 5)
King Svase's daughter. She becomes Bjorn's third wife and is killed in battle. Loosely based on the legendary Snæfrithr Svásadottir, a wife of Harald Fairhair.

Lord Cyneheard
 Played by Malcolm Douglas (season 5)
An ealdorman of Wessex. He conspires with Prince Aethelred to overthrow King Alfred.

Elsewith
 Played by Róisín Murphy (season 5)
Mannel's daughter, Queen Judith's niece and King Alfred's wife. She has an affair with Bjorn.

Thora
 Played by Eve Connolly (seasons 5–6)
Hvitserk's love interest. Ivar has her burned after she implicates herself as a critic of Ivar's regime and denies his status as a god. Hvitserk after consuming psychedelic mushrooms, believes he is haunted by her ghost who implores him to kill Ivar.

Lady Ethelfled
 Played by Ann Skelly (season 5)
Lord Cuthred's daughter and Prince Aethelred's wife.

King Olaf the Stout
 Played by Steven Berkoff (seasons 5–6)
A Norwegian king with whom Ivar seeks an alliance. Hvitserk is sent to broker the deal, but Hvitserk instead asks Olaf to help overthrow Ivar. The amused Olaf has Hvitserk imprisoned and tortured. When Hvitserk refuses to relent, the impressed Olaf agrees to attack Kattegat. After the battle, he declares Bjorn king of Kattegat. Harald is seriously injured, and Olaf saves his life, but also occupies his kingdom and keeps Harald a prisoner.

Amma
 Played by Kristy Dawn Dinsmore (seasons 5–6)
A shieldmaiden in Harald's army. After the re-conquest of Kattegat by Bjorn she is made Hvitserk's caretaker. She is killed by Ganbaatar in the final battle between the Norwegian collation and the Rus'.

Ingrid
 Played by Lucy Martin (season 6)
A slave serving Gunnhild and Bjorn in Kattegat. She becomes the fifth wife of Bjorn. After Harald rapes her and Bjorn is slain in battle, she marries Harald unsure if the child she is carrying is Bjorn's or Harald's. She is later revealed to be a witch, and after Harald's death, Ingrid becomes the sole ruler of Kattegat, ending Ragnar Lothbrok's legacy.

Ganbaatar
 Played by Andrei Claude (season 6)
Oleg's captain. He is decapitated by Gunnhild after his horse is shot dead by Ingrid.

Prince Dir
 Played by Lenn Kudrjawizki (season 6)
Oleg's brother. Oleg tortures him but he escapes after getting help from Ivar.

Prince Igor
 Played by Oran Glynn O'Donovan (season 6)
The son of Rurik and heir to Kievan Rus'. He is the ward of Oleg, who rules the kingdom in his name as regent. Igor fears Oleg, and is keen to escape to Oleg's brothers Dir and Askold. However, he is aware that he can use Oleg as a puppet, just as Oleg uses him. Igor and Ivar form a bond. Based on the historical Igor of Kiev.

Princess Katia
 Played by Alicia Agneson (season 6)
Oleg's second wife, who has a striking resemblance to Freydis. She has an affair with Ivar and it is revealed that she is a spy who was sent by Dir to overthrow Oleg. She later helps Hvitserk, Ivar and Igor escape from Oleg and is present when Oleg dies.

Anna
 Played by Serena Kennedy (season 6) and Isabelle Connolly (season 6)
Dir's wife who helps to rescue him.

King Hakon
 Played by Mishaël Lopes Cardozo (season 6)
One of the kings of Norway and a rival to Bjorn.

Gudrid
 Played by Noella Brennan (season 6)
A settler who travels west with Ubbe's crew. She loses her son at sea.

Naad
 Played by Ian Lloyd Anderson (season 6)
A settler who travels west with Ubbe's crew.

Peminuit
 Played by Wesley French (season 6)
A Miꞌkmaq warrior of the New Land. He is the eldest son of Pekitaulet, the Sagamaw of her tribe.

We'jitu
 Played by Phillip Lewitski (season 6)
A Miꞌkmaq warrior and Peminuit's younger brother. He is killed by Naad.

Vikings: Valhalla

King Sweyn Forkbeard
 Played by Søren Pilmark
King Sweyn Forkbeard is the retired king of Denmark who steps in as acting ruler in England when Canute goes to fight of a Vendish invasion in Denmark. He becomes an unlikely ally to Emma. Based on the historical Sweyn Forkbeard.

Queen Aelfgifu
 Played by Pollyanna McIntosh
Queen Aelfgifu is the first wife of Canute and is the Queen of Denmark. She is from Mercia. Aelfgifu is calculating, ambitious and charming and tries to gain as much power and respect as her husband. Based on the historical Queen Aelfgifu.

Jarl Kåre
 Played by Asbjørn Krogh Nissen
A norwegian jarl who wants to eradicate paganism in Norway. He hates pagans after his parents offered up his older brother as a human sacrifice in Uppsala when he was a child. He is the principal antagonist of season 1 of Vikings: Valhalla.

Eleana
 Played by Sofya Lebedeva
The daughter of the Chude lord Vitomir. She becomes romantically involved with Harald during their perilous journey through Rus.

Lord Harekr
 Played by Bradley James
The ruler of Jomsborg, presented in the show as a pagan police state in Pomerania.

Lord Vitomir
 Played by Steven Brand
The lord of Chude and father of Eleana. He makes a deal to fund Harald's trade expedition to Constantinople so he and his daughter can have his protection on their own diplomatic journey to the city. He drowns in the Dnieper when the frozen river breaks during thaw.

Agnarr
 Played by Christopher Rygh 
One of Canute's huscarls. He becomes Emma's principal ally and enforcer in season 2 when Canute is away to fight the Vends.

Minor characters
The following is a list of named characters who have had a relatively relevant story arc on the series. They are listed in the order that they first appeared on the show.

 Eddie Drew (seasons 1 and 3) and André Eriksen (season 4) as Odin, appearing to Ragnar and his sons
 Gary Murphy as Bishop Unwan, serving at the court of King Aelle (seasons 1, 4)
 Carl Shaaban as Jesus, appearing to Athelstan and Ragnar (seasons 2–3)
 Søren Pilmark as Stender, a farmer who escaped Wessex after Aethelwulf's raid (seasons 3–4)
 Siggy (played by an uncredited infant actress), Þórunn and Bjorn's daughter who dies in childhood(seasons 3–4)
 Conn Rogers as Canute, a member of King Olaf's court (seasons 5–6)
 Martin Maloney as Vigrid, one of Ivar's men (seasons 5–6)

Season 1
 Eddie Elks as Olafur, a Viking warrior in the service of Earl Haraldson
 Jouko Ahola as Kauko, a Finnish Viking and one of Ragnar's warriors
 Eric Higgins as Knut Tjodolf, Earl Haraldson's half-brother
 Will Irvine as Brother Cenwulf, serving at the monastery of Lindisfarne
 Sam Lucas Smith as Edwin, a Saxon
 Jonathon Kemp as Lord Wigea, an advisor of King Aelle
 Peter Gaynor as Lord Edgar, an advisor of King Aelle
 Trevor Cooper as Earl Bjarni, Thyri's husband who is far older than her and is later killed by Siggy
 Angus MacInnes as Tostig, an old Viking warrior

Season 2
 Morgan C. Jones as The Law Giver, the lawspeaker of Kattegat
 Duncan Lacroix as Ealdorman Werferth of Wessex, serving King Ecbert
 Richard Ashton as Thorvard, a Viking warrior loyal to King Horik

Season 3
 Mark Huberman as Louis, a soldier in Paris

Season 4
 Niall Cusack as Abbot Lupus, Rollo's teacher in Paris
 Charles Last as William, first son of Rollo and Gisla
 Charlie Kelly as Egil, an agent of King Harald
 Caitlin Scott as Princess Blaeja, Judith's sister
 Jack Nolan as Earl Jorgensen, a Swedish warlord, sacrificed to the gods by Lagertha to secure the victory against the Saxons.
 Sophie Vavasseur as Princess Ellisif, the former betrothed of King Harald
 Gary Buckley as Earl Vik, Princess Ellisif's husband
 Uncredited child actor as Marcellus, second son of Rollo and Gisla
 Uncredited child actress as Celsa, daughter of Rollo and Gisla

Season 5
 Keith McErlean as Lord Denewulf, a nobleman in service of Bishop Heahmund
 Albano Jerónimo as Euphemius, a Byzantine commander, based on the historical Euphemius of Sicily
 Paul Reid as Mannel, Queen Judith's cousin
 Khaled Abol Naga as Ziyadat Allah, an Arab ruler.  Based on the historical  Ziyadat Allah I of Ifriqiya
 Damien Devaney as Wilfred, a nobleman and Princess Elsewith's steward
 Tomi May as Jarl Olavosonn, Ivar's commander in York. He is loosely based on the historical warlord Bagsecg
 Erik Madsen as King Hemming, a leader of the Black Danes confederation
 Markjan Winnick as King Angantyr, a leader of the Black Danes confederation
 Gavan Ó Connor Duffy as King Frodo, a leader of the Black Danes confederation

Season 6
 Gina Costigan as Runa, a former shield-maiden at Lagertha's village
 David Sterne as Gudmund, an old man at Lagertha's village
 Kathy Monahan as Eira, a former shield-maiden at Lagertha's village
 Per Fredrik Åsly as an envoy from Ubbe's trade expedition
 Oisin Murray as Tarben, a young boy at Lagertha's village
 Aoibheann McCann as Skadi, a shield-maiden under Gunnhild's command
 Fredrik Hiller as Jarl Thorkell the Tall, one the jarls of Norway and a rival to Bjorn
 Amy De Bruhn as Jarl Hrolf, one the jarls of Norway
 Brent Burns as Skane, one of Harald's ambitious followers
 Ivo Alexandre as Bishop Leon, who visits Kiev for Easter
 Russell Balogh as Bishop Aldulf, a warrior priest in King Alfred's army
 Breffni Holahan as Sister Annis, a nun who assists Queen Elsewith
 Brendan McCormack as Leof, a soldier in King Alfred's army
 Oliver Price as Galan, a soldier in King Alfred's army
 Dafhyd Flynn as Adam, a soldier in King Alfred's army
 Tim Creed as Orlyg, a slave serving King Erik in Kattegat
 Carmen Moore as Pekitaulet, Peminuit and We'jitu's mother and the Sagamaw of her tribe
 Ellyn Jade as Nikani, Peminuit's wife
 Acahkos Johnson as Na'pa'tes, a Miꞌkmaq child
 Victoire Dauxerre as Nissa, a slave in the service of Queen Ingrid in Kattegat
 Sean McGillicuddy as Osric, Bishop Aldulf's second-in-command

Guest characters
The following is a list of named characters who appeared in just one episode of the series.

Season 1
 Gerard McCarthy as Brondsted, a Viking who attacks Lagertha
 Billy Gibson as Ulf, Earl Haraldson's bodyguard
 David Wilmot as Olaf Andwend, a Viking accused of theft
 Conor Madden as Eric Trygvasson, a Viking who is prosecuted in Kattegat by Earl Haraldson
 Cian Quinn as Olaf, son of Ingolf
 Craig Whittaker as Hakon, a Viking and one of Ragnar's men
 Des Braiden as Father Cuthbert, in charge of the monastery of Lindisfarne
 Sebastiaan Vermeul Taback as Osiric
 David Murray as Lord Aethelwulf, the brother of King Aelle
 Sean Treacy as Prince Egbert, King Aelle and Queen Ealhswith's son
 James Flynn as Eadric, a Saxon lord
 David Michael Scott as Nils, a Viking warrior from Götaland in the service of Jarl Borg

Season 2
 Anna Åström as Hild, a servant in Kattegat
 Jay Duffy as Ari, King Horik's second son
 Alan Devine as Ealdorman Eadric of Wessex, serving King Ecbert
 Edmund Kente as Bishop Swithern of Winchester. Based on the historical Swithun.
 Jens Christian Buskov Lund as Olrik
 Elizabeth Moynihan as Queen Gunnhild of Denmark, King Horik's wife

Season 3
 Ian Beattie as King Brihtwulf of Mercia, Kwenthrith and Burgred's uncle. Based on the historical Beorhtwulf of Mercia.
 James Murphy as Ansgar, a monk trying to convert Vikings in Kattegat. Based on the historical Ansgar.

Season 4
 Cillian O'Sullivan as Eirik, a Viking warrior in Paris, former second in command of Rollo. He is betrayed by him and killed by Franks.
 Robert "Robban" Follin as Berserker, an assassin recruited by Erlendur and Kalf
 Declan Conlon as Lord Wigstan, a relative of Kwenthrith and head of the Royal Family of Mercia. Based on the semi-historical Wigstan.
 John Kavanagh as Pope Leo IV
 Adam McNamara as Thorhall, a Danish Viking
 Liam Clarke as Gudmund, a settler in Ragnar and Ivar's party
 Ed Murphy as Gardar, a settler in Ragnar and Ivar's party
 Jack Walsh as Scotus, loosely based on the historical John Scotus Eriugena
 Josh Donaldson as Hoskuld, a Viking warrior of great skill
 Tamaryn Payne as Widow Ordlaf, a lady of Sherborne

Season 5
 India Mullen as Aethegyth, a noblewoman from Wessex
 Frank Prendergast as Bishop Cynebert of York
 Laurence O'Fuarain as Hakon, a whale hunter of Vestfold
 Bosco Hogan as the Lord Abbot of Lindisfarne
 Mabel Hurley as young Lagertha, appearing in a flashback
 Ross Matthew Anderson as Lagertha's father, appearing in a flashback
 Jamie Maclachlan as Aldwin, a Saxon commander
 Uncredited infant actor as Baldur, Ivar and Freydis's son

Season 6
 Blake Kubena as Prince Askold of Novgorod, Oleg's brother
 Sandy Kennedy as Sylvi, a former shield-maiden at Lagertha's village
 Neil Keery as Alexei, a guard in Kiev
 Anna Maria Jopek as a singer in Kattegat
 Jinny Lofthouse as Hild, a shield-maiden under Gunnhild's command
 Emma Willis as Gyda, a shield maiden that volunteers as a sacrifice
 Karen Connell as the Angel of Death, a völva
 Adam Winnick as Rangvald, Harald's captain
 Emma Eliza Regan as Aoife, a villager from Istrehågan
 Ronan Summers as Herigar, one of Erik's warriors
 Katherine Devlin as Natasha, at Oleg's court
 Noah Syndergaard as Thorbjorn, a Viking warrior in Kattegat
 Jerry-Jane Pears as Iðunn, the goddess of youth, who appears to Hvitserk
 Bryan Larkin as Wiglaf, a Saxon commander

Family trees
Continuous lines signify a lineal descent and/or consanguinity, dashed lines signify a marriage, and dotted lines signify a sexual relationship.

Earl Haraldson, King Ragnar, King Horik, Emperor Charles, King Harald's and Prince Oleg's family tree

King Ecbert and King Aelle's family tree

Queen Kwenthrith's family tree

Floki's family tree

Kjetill and Eyvind's family tree

Pekitaulet's family tree

References

Lists of Canadian television series characters
Lists of drama television characters